Tenzin Ösel Hita (born 12 February 1985 in Bubión, Granada, Spain) is a Tibetan Buddhist tulku and an aspiring filmmaker from Spain.

Born Ösel Hita Torres  to María Torres and Francisco Hita, he was designated soon after his birth as the tulku or reincarnation of Thubten Yeshe—making him one of only a handful of Western tulkus—and renamed Tenzin Ösel Rinpoche.()

For many years "Lama Ösel" was expected to succeed to leadership of the Foundation for the Preservation of the Mahayana Tradition (FPMT), the organization co-founded by Yeshe. As a university student, "Oz" (as he came to be known) gradually distanced himself from the FPMT, and in 2009 made media statements indicating his intention to pursue a life independent of that organization. However, he remained a follower of Tibetan Buddhism and an FPMT supporter, joining that organization's board of trustees in 2010 (but no longer listed after 2018).

Biography 
Hita's parents, María Torres and Francisco Hita, had been students of Lama Yeshe, and the suggestion was raised soon after his birth that Hita might be Yeshe's tulku (reincarnation). Fourteen months later, after certain traditional tests, the Dalai Lama formally recognized him as such. As a child "Lama Ösel" was heavily promoted by the FPMT, and made the subject of a book by Vicki Mackenzie, Reincarnation: The Boy Lama (Wisdom Publications, 1996). He is the fifth of nine siblings.

As a youth Hita studied traditional Tibetan subjects at Sera Monastery in southern India, and simultaneously received private tutoring in Western subjects.

At age 18, Hita gave up his monastic robes and distanced himself from the FPMT in favor of a more secular lifestyle, for example performing at the 2007 Burning Man festival. He later attended St. Michaels University School, a private high school in Victoria, British Columbia. Once he passed his ASATs in Canada, he moved to Switzerland and studied western philosophy, human rights, French and art. After six months he decided to leave for Italy, ending up in Bologna working with Matteo Passigato, an experienced camera operator. There he spent another 6 months working different jobs related to cinema and TV.

Once he came back to Spain he decided to study film. So at the age of 20 he spent two years at the NIC school in Madrid getting his director of cinema diploma. Then another year for director of photography. After that he did a master for documentaries at EIMA which took one more year. In 2011, Osel is said to have joined the board of the FPMT although as of January 2019 he is not listed as a Director on the FPMT website, and there has not been any notification that he was expelled or had resigned from or otherwise left the FPMT Board of Directors.

In December 2012 he released his film Being Your True Nature.

Personal Development 

After attaining his majority, formulaic greetings regularly appeared in FPMT publications. In May 2009, Hita gave an interview for Babylon Magazine, a bilingual (Spanish/English) Madrid periodical. In it he expressed belief in reincarnation, and admiration for Lama Zopa and the Dalai Lama, while complaining of discomfort with his exile Tibetan environs:

"I returned to Spain because I had arrived at a point where I no longer fitted within that life. I couldn't find myself, because for me it was a lie being there living something that was imposed from outside."

Having left Sera monastery at eighteen, without going on for the geshe degree, he felt unqualified to teach, as the FPMT expected of him: "The literal translation of lama is teacher, and I'm no teacher."

Similar, but more pointed, remarks soon appeared in the Spanish newspaper El Mundo:

"Con 14 meses ya me habían reconocido y llevado a la India. Me vistieron con un gorro amarillo, me sentaron en un trono, la gente me veneraba... Me sacaron de mi familia y me metieron en una situación medieval en la que he sufrido muchísimo. Era como vivir en una mentira."

["At 14 months I was recognized and taken to India. They dressed me in a yellow hat, they sat me on a throne, people worshipped me ... They took me away from my family and put me in a medieval situation in which I suffered a lot. It was like living a lie."]

Extracts appeared the following day in The Guardian (UK). Wisdom Publications (the FPMT publisher) then reported on these developments on its blog under the title "Tempest in a Teapot," claiming that Hita's original comments had been misrepresented and taken out of context. According to Wisdom, the article from El Mundo had been based on the one for Babylon Magazine.

On 3 June 2009, a message from Hita appeared on the FPMT website, saying that despite the difficulties alluded to above, he was "privileged" to have received an education rooted in both Eastern and Western cultures. However, as of 2018 this message could not be found on the link provided:

"That experience was really good and I so appreciate it. However, certain media find ways to sensationalize and exaggerate an unusual story. So I hope that what appears in news print is not read and taken too literally. Don't believe everything that is written! Experience shows that however hard one tries in interviews to sincerely and honestly convey key information, the printed result can tend towards sensationalism to get the most attention. FPMT is doing a great job and Lama Zopa is an immensely special person – very inspiring and a great yogi. [...] There is no separation between myself and FPMT..."

However, in a video posted on YouTube in December 2018, on 27 December 2018 he gave a two-part, 3-hour long talk to students at the FPMT-affiliated Tibetan Buddhist Centre, Institut Vajra Yogini, at Lavaur, near Toulouse, France.

In November 2019, Hita showed his commitment to supporting the UK Daily Mirror's "Million Trees" Campaign, along with the 14th Dalai Lama and Hollywood legend Richard Gere.

Resumption of his vocation 
A documentary about Hita's life, called The Reluctant Lama, was broadcast on BBC Radio 4 on 28 September 2012. The documentary was produced by Beth O'Dea and presented by Jolyon Jenkins.

A documentary series about Hita's life, called Osel, was releases on HBO Max in 2022.

References

Bibliography 
Vicki MacKenzie, Reborn in the West, Harper Collins, 1997. 
"Osel's Awakening: A Kid Against His Destiny," by Diego Pontones. In Babylon Magazine # 5, May 2009, http://issuu.com/babylonmagazine/docs/bm5/57
Boy chosen by Dalai Lama turns back on Buddhist order – from The Guardian, 31 May 2009.
 Osel Hita Torres, the reluctant lama – an article from the BBC News site, 28 September 2012

External links 
"A website dedicated to Osel Hita, his life and teachings"
The Reluctant Lama
Photo of Lama Osel
"The boy lama becomes agnostic" – 2009 interview for the Spanish newspaper El Mundo (in Spanish, photo)
https://www.youtube.com/watch?v=oPYfJmLvwvI (2012) Singapour
https://www.youtube.com/watch?v=hSVjX_EE-mg (2013) India
https://www.youtube.com/watch?v=YQRuE2372Bo&t=35s (2013) Nepal
https://www.youtube.com/watch?v=dLt_lt_b9eA (2013) USA
https://www.youtube.com/watch?v=Iq7xseUOwHQ (2015) Malaysia
https://www.youtube.com/watch?v=Tamyh6yTGeo (2017) France
https://www.youtube.com/watch?v=jk-u6ka1Q6s&t=537s (2017) Holande
https://www.youtube.com/watch?v=eM51kUUwHLY&t=1446s (2018) France
https://www.youtube.com/watch?v=kSkmfnGeC1Y (2018) Spain
https://www.youtube.com/watch?v=NjhlnNlwsH4&t=1023s (2020) UK

1985 births
Lamas
Living people
Gelug tulkus
Tibetan Buddhists from Spain
Spanish Buddhists
Rinpoches
Gelug Lamas
Foundation for the Preservation of the Mahayana Tradition